Jalan Sungai Klah, Federal Route 1149, is a federal road in Perak, Malaysia.

At most sections, the Federal Route 1149 was built under the JKR R5 road standard, with a speed limit of 90 km/h.

List of junctions

Malaysian Federal Roads